The Presbyterian Cathedral of Rio de Janeiro is a historic congregation of the Presbyterian Church of Brazil. It was the first Presbyterian church in the country.

History 
Ashbel Green Simonton established the church on January 12, 1862. It used various sites until it acquired its current site in December 1870.  On March 29, 1874, the building was opened as the first church building of the Presbyterians in Brazil. During 1897–1925 Rev. Álvaro Reis was the pastor. His influence and service was recognized through the name of a middle school and a square in Rio. In August 1926 Rev. Matthias Gomes de Santos remade the project of constructing a new building. He invited the architect Ascanio Viana who redesigned the building in a Neo-Gothic style. This work lasted about 14 years.  It was several times renovated, the last was in 2002. The church celebrated its 150th anniversary on Thursday, January 12, 2012.

Pastors 
Ashbel Green Simonton: 1862–67
Alexander Latimer Bradford: 1867–1874
Alvaro Reis: 1897–1925
Matthias Gomes dos Santos: 1926–47
Amantino Adorno Vassao: 1947–81 
Guilhermino Cunha: 1981–2015
Jorge Patrocínio: 2015–present

References

External links 

Website of the Presbyterian Catedral
Facebook site

Cathedrals in Rio de Janeiro (city)